Tomwool Lake is a small lake in geographic Lee Township in the Unorganized West Part of Timiskaming District, in northeastern Ontario, Canada. The lake is in the James Bay drainage basin and is on Tomwool Creek. The nearest community is Bourkes,  to the northeast.

The primary inflow, at the west, is Tomwool Creek arriving from Arras Lake. There are secondary inflows at the west and east. The primary outflow, at the south, is also Tomwool Creek, which heads south. Tomwwool Creek flows via Sarsfield Creek, Meyers Lake, Woollings Creek, the Whiteclay River, the Black River, the Abitibi River and the Moose River to James Bay.

References

Other map sources:

Lakes of Timiskaming District